Monoloxis flavicinctalis is a species of snout moth in the genus Monoloxis. It was described by Jan Sepp in 1852, and is known from Suriname and Brazil.

The caterpillars of this species make a cocoon was composed of the caterpillars'  interwoven with threads of silk. Approaching the time of metamorphosis, it makes  a separate cocoon, composed of fragments of trimmed wood  mixed with its excrement.

References

Moths described in 1850
Chrysauginae